John Hollansworth Jr. (born September 18, 1958) is a former driver in the Indy Racing League. He raced in the 1999–2001 seasons with 12 career starts, all but 2 of them in 1999, including the 1999 Indianapolis 500. His best career finish was at the 1999 Pikes Peaks Raceway event where he had a podium finish<Bill Barnett / PR Director and pit crew member for Team Xtreme 1999 & 2000>. He did not lead a lap in any IRL race.

Racing record

American Open Wheel
(key)

IndyCar results

References

External links

1963 births
Indianapolis 500 drivers
IndyCar Series drivers
Living people
Racing drivers from Oklahoma
Racing drivers from Oklahoma City
Sportspeople from Oklahoma City
U.S. F2000 National Championship drivers
SCCA National Championship Runoffs winners